This Is the Way is the second and final studio album by the Rossington Collins Band.

Reception

Robin Smith of Record Mirror panned the album in a 1/5 star review, calling it "the biggest load of hackneyed bollocks I've heard for a good six months." Michael B. Smith gave the album 3/5 stars in a retrospective review for AllMusic, writing that the band "pay due homage to Ronnie Van Zandt [sic] with the songs 'Tashauna' and 'Pine Box', and rock with the best of 'em on 'Gotta Get It Straight' and "Gonna Miss It When It's Gone'."

Track listing
"Gotta Get It Straight" (Krantz, Powell, Rossington) – 4:43
"Tashauna" (Krantz, Rossington) – 4:57
"Gonna Miss It When It's Gone" (Collins, Krantz, Rossington) – 3:51
"Pine Box" (Harwood) – 3:04
"Fancy Ideas" (Harwood, Hess, Wilkeson) – 4:36
"Don't Stop Me Now" (Krantz, Rossington) – 3:43
"Seems Like Every Day" (Krantz, Rossington) – 4:30
"I'm Free Today" (Harwood) – 3:24
"Next Phone Call" (Krantz, Rossington) – 3:33
"Means Nothing to You" (Harwood) – 5:00

Personnel
Allen Collins - guitars
Barry Lee Harwood - guitars, vocals
Derek Hess - drums
Dale Krantz-Rossington - vocals
Billy Powell - piano
Gary Rossington - guitars
Leon Wilkeson - bass
Steve Klein - engineer, mixing

References

1982 albums